KQEP-LP was an FM radio station broadcasting on a frequency of 97.9 Megahertz.  KQEP-LP had a Chinese format and was licensed to the city of Saint Paul, Minnesota. Its license expired April 1, 2021, as its owners did not renew the station's license.

References 

Low-power FM radio stations in Minnesota
Radio stations in Minnesota
Radio stations established in 2017
2017 establishments in Minnesota
Radio stations disestablished in 2021
2021 disestablishments in Minnesota
Defunct mass media in Minnesota
Defunct radio stations in the United States